Waverly School District may refer to:

Waverly Community Schools, Michigan
Waverly School District 145, Nebraska
Waverly Central School District, New York